Thomas Crawley may refer to:

 Thomas Crawley (MP) (died 1559), member of parliament for Aylesbury
 Thomas Cranley or Craule (c. 1337–1417), Archbishop of Dublin
 Thomas Crawley, of SS Kate
 Tom Crawley (1911–1977), Scottish footballer